The Moundville Archaeological Museum  is an archaeological park and museum in Moundville, Alabama 
The museum houses artifacts and displays exhibits on over 60 years of archaeological excavations and investigations in the Moundville Archaeological Park.

The Jones Archaeological Museum located in the park was opened on May 16, 1939, and was initially known as the "Mound State Monument."

The museum was originally designed with two wings dedicated to burials which was closed in 1989 and a central section with exhibits displaying artifacts recovered from the site. The previous burial wings were replaced with a theater and several exhibition halls.

The park and museum are part of the University of Alabama Museums, which also include the University of Alabama Arboretum, Alabama Museum of Natural History, Discovering Alabama, Gorgas House, Office of Archaeological Research and Paul W. Bryant Museum.

See also
List of museums in Alabama

References

External links
 

Native American museums in Alabama
Museums established in 1939
Archaeological museums in Alabama
Museums in Tuscaloosa County, Alabama
Archaeological parks
1939 establishments in Alabama